Vladimir Moragrega Soto (born 26 July 1998) is a Mexican professional footballer who plays as a forward for Atlético La Paz on loan from Atlético San Luis.

Club career

Atlético San Luis
In summer 2021, Moragrega signed with Liga MX side Atlético San Luis. On 22 February 2022, he went on a season-long loan with Canadian Premier League side Atlético Ottawa, a fellow Atlético Madrid-owned club. In December 2022, he joined Atlético La Paz for 2023.

Honours

Atlético Ottawa 
 Canadian Premier League
Regular Season: 2022

Career statistics

Notes

References

1998 births
Living people
Association football forwards
Mexican footballers
Footballers from Sinaloa
People from Ahome Municipality
Mexican expatriate footballers
Expatriate soccer players in Canada
Mexican expatriate sportspeople in Canada
Club Tijuana footballers
Alebrijes de Oaxaca players
Dorados de Sinaloa footballers
Atlante F.C. footballers
Atlético San Luis footballers
Atlético Ottawa players
Liga Premier de México players
Ascenso MX players
Liga de Expansión MX players
Canadian Premier League players